Gateway is the name of a small industrial and residential neighborhood in Northeast Washington, D.C. It is bounded by New York Avenue NE to the south and southeast, Bladensburg Road to the west, and South Dakota Avenue to the northeast. Gateway is across New York Avenue from the U.S. National Arboretum.

The neighborhood takes its name from the period when the Washington Branch of the Baltimore and Ohio Railroad ran in place of present-day New York Avenue. The eastern edge of the District of Columbia was occupied by the military jurisdiction of Fort Lincoln, but Gateway (immediately southwest of Fort Lincoln) was the first civilian area of the District through which trains passed.

Gateway is the site of the printing press facility for The Washington Times newspaper.

Gallery

Neighborhoods in Northeast (Washington, D.C.)